The Duchess is a historic sponge-hooking boat in Tarpon Springs, Florida. It is located at the Tarpon Springs Sponge Docks at Dodecanese Boulevard. On August 2, 1990, it was added to the U.S. National Register of Historic Places.

References

External links
 Pinellas County listings at National Register of Historic Places
 Florida's Office of Cultural and Historical Programs
 Pinellas County listings
 Duchess

Sponge diving boats
National Register of Historic Places in Pinellas County, Florida
Buildings and structures in Tarpon Springs, Florida